Broadway Hotel in Custer City, Oklahoma, is a two-story hotel building that was built in 1908.  It was listed on the National Register of Historic Places in 1985.

It has 12 hotel rooms and, as of 1988, was the only commercial business in Custer City that had operated in the same building since the town's early days.

References

Buildings and structures in Custer County, Oklahoma
Hotel buildings on the National Register of Historic Places in Oklahoma
National Register of Historic Places in Custer County, Oklahoma